Carl Sigismund Kunth (18 June 1788 – 22 March 1850), also Karl Sigismund Kunth or anglicized as Charles Sigismund Kunth, was a German botanist. He is known for being one of the first to study and categorise plants from the American continents, publishing Nova genera et species plantarum quas in peregrinatione ad plagam aequinoctialem orbis novi collegerunt Bonpland et Humboldt (7 vols., Paris, 1815–1825).

Born in Leipzig, Kunth became a merchant's clerk in Berlin in 1806.  After meeting Alexander von Humboldt, who helped him attend lectures at the University of Berlin, Kunth became interested in botany. Kunth worked as Humboldt's assistant in Paris from 1813 to 1819. He classified plants that had been collected by Humboldt and Aimé Bonpland during their journey through the Americas.

When Kunth returned to Berlin in 1820, he became Professor of Botany at the University of Berlin, as well as the Vice President of the Berlin botanical garden.  In 1829, he was elected member of the Academy of Sciences in Berlin.

In 1829, he sailed for South America, and over the following three years visited Chile, Peru, Brazil, Venezuela, Central America, and the West Indies.

After his death in 1850, the government of the Prussian acquired his botanical collection, which later formed part of the Royal Herbarium in Berlin.

An endemic Hawaiian fern species, Doodia kunthiana Gaudichaud, which is a member of the fern family Blechnaceae, is named after him.

 Note: Kunth = C.S. Kunth; H.B.K. = Humboldt, Bonpland & Kunth

List of selected publications

 , 
Les mimosees et autres plantes legumineuses du nouveau continent (1819)
Synopsis plantarum quas in itinere ad plagain aequinoctialem orbis novi collegerunt Humboldt et Bonpland (1822–3)
Les graminees de l'Amerique du Sud (2 vols., 1825–1833)
Handbuch der Botanik (Berlin, 1831)

Lehrbuch der Botanik (1847)
Les melastomees et autres plantes legumineuses de l'Amerique du Sud (1847–1852)

See also
:Category:Taxa named by Carl Sigismund Kunth

Notes

References 
 
 
 Malpighiaceae/Kunth

1788 births
1850 deaths
German taxonomists
German explorers
19th-century German botanists
Botanists active in North America
Botanists active in South America
Members of the French Academy of Sciences
Recipients of the Pour le Mérite (civil class)
Humboldt University of Berlin alumni
Scientists from Leipzig
Members of the Prussian Academy of Sciences
Members of the Bavarian Academy of Sciences
Members of the German Academy of Sciences Leopoldina